Actiniscus is a genus of dinoflagellate belonging to the family Actiniscaceae.

The genus was first described by Christian Gottfried Ehrenberg in 1843.

Species:
 Actiniscus pentasterias (Ehrenberg) Ehrenberg

References

Gymnodiniales
Dinoflagellate genera